Soufian Farid Ouédraogo (born 26 December 1996) is a Burkinabé professional footballer who plays as a goalkeeper for USFA and the Burkina Faso national team.

International career
Ouédraogo was part of the Burkina Faso national team for the 2020 African Nations Championship.

References

External links

1996 births
Living people
Sportspeople from Ouagadougou
Burkinabé footballers
Burkina Faso international footballers
Burkinabé Premier League players
Rail Club du Kadiogo players
Rahimo FC players
US des Forces Armées players
Association football goalkeepers
21st-century Burkinabé people
2021 Africa Cup of Nations players
Burkina Faso A' international footballers
2020 African Nations Championship players